Pepper(s) may refer to:

Food and spice
 Piperaceae or the pepper family, a large family of flowering plant
 Black pepper
 Long pepper
 Capsicum or pepper, a genus of flowering plants in the nightshade family Solanaceae
 Bell pepper
 Chili pepper
 Sichuan pepper, a strong spice
"Alder pepper", the flower of Alnus alnobetula

Music
 Pepper (band), a rock-reggae band originally from Hawaii
 The Peppers, a French male instrumental group
 "Pepper" (song), a 1996 song by Butthole Surfers
 "Pepper", an instrumental song by Linkin Park from LP Underground 12

People and fictional characters 
 Pepper (name), a list of people and fictional characters with either the given name or surname
 Peppers (surname), a list of people with the surname

Science and technology
 Pepper (cryptography), a secret value added before hashing
 Pepper (robot), a humanoid robot by Aldebaran Robotics and SoftBank Mobile
 PPAPI or Pepper Plugin API, an interface for web browser plugins

Sports
 Pepper (baseball), an exercise and a game
 Pepper (volleyball), a drill
 Newark Peppers, a defunct Major League Baseball team in the Federal League

Other uses
 "Pepper" (The Brak Show), a 2002 episode
 Pepper (card game), an alternate name for bid euchre
 Pepper (dog), a Dalmatian whose death led to the U.S. Animal Welfare Act of 1966
 Pepper (film), a 1936 American comedy film
 Pepper, West Virginia
 Perets' or Pepper, a Ukrainian satirical newspaper
 Cynthia Peretti or Pepper, professional wrestler from the Gorgeous Ladies of Wrestling

See also 
 Dr Pepper, a carbonated soft drink
 Pepper II, an early 1980s video game by Exidy
 Pepper Creek (disambiguation)
 Peppercorn (disambiguation)